The 2019 Interim Union Budget of India was presented by acting Finance Minister Piyush Goyal on 1 February 2019. The government introduced Pradhan Mantri Kisan Samman Nidhi and Pradhan Mantri Shram Yogi Mandhan.

Highlights
In the budget, the fiscal deficit for 2019–20 will be 3.94% of GDP. The budget set aside  for farmers having up to 2 hectares of land. The amount is available in 3 equal installments of Rs.2000 each under Pradhan Mantri Kisan Samman Nidhi.  per month pension after 60 years of age to unorganized sector labor under Pradhan Mantri Shram Yogi Mandhan. Subscribers have to pay a monthly amount of Rs.100 if aged 29 years and Rs.55 if a subscriber is of 18 years of age.

In the 2018 Budget, the outlay was revised for six key social schemes focused on enhancing the welfare of farmers and the poor, in addition to announcing a new scheme aimed at direct cash transfers to farmers.  Apart from that, allocation across three other schemes focused on rural India have been raised.

References

External links 
 Times Of India: Interim-Union Budget 2019 Highlights
 Government of India: Union Budget and Economic Survey

Union budgets of India
2019 in Indian economy
2019 government budgets
Modi administration